Vanner (stylized as VANNER) is a South Korean boy band formed by VT Entertainment. The group is composed of five members: Taehwan, Gon, Hyesung, Ahxian, Youngkwang. The group debuted on February 14, 2019 with the studio album V.

History

2018: Pre-debut and Japanese promotions 
Vanner started their promotions in Japan in 2018, holding concerts in Tokyo. They performed more than 200 times in Japan prior to their Korean debut. Vanner announced on their Twitter and Instagram account that they would start a debut project album from January 18, 2019 through March 4, 2019. They made over 18 thousand dollars with the goal of 4,500.

2019: Debut with V and 5cean: V 
On February 14, the group released the music video for their title track "Better Do Better" on YouTube. The following day, they released their debut album V as well as appeared on Mnet's music show M Countdown for the first time.

On September 4, the group released their first single album 5cean: V and its title track "Crazy Love".

2020: Life 
On December 1, the group released their second single album Life and its title track "Form" (폼).

2022: Take Off 
On February 28, the group released their third single album Take Off.

Members 
 Taehwan (태환)
 Gon (곤)
 Hyesung (혜성)
 Ahxian (아시안)
 Youngkwang (영광)

Discography

Studio albums

Single albums

Concert tours 
Vanner 2022 US Tour: Boost Up Part I

 Chicago, IL - March 16th, 2022
 Warrendale, PA - March 18th, 2022
 New York City, New York - March 19th, 2022
 Atlanta, GA - March 22nd, 2022
 Orlando, FL - March 24th, 2022
 Houston, TX - March 26th, 2022 (Cancelled show)
 Dallas, TX - March 28th, 2022
 San Antonio, TX - March 29th, 2022
 Sauget, IL - March 31st, 2022
 Lawrence, KS - April 1st, 2022
 Denver, CO - April 3rd, 2022
 Salt Lake City, UT - April 4th, 2022
 San Francisco, CA - April 6th, 2022
 Los Angeles, CA - April 8th, 2022

References

External links 
 

K-pop music groups
2019 establishments in South Korea
Musical groups established in 2019
South Korean boy bands
Musical groups from Seoul
Peak Time contestants